South River Forest is a forested area in southeast DeKalb County, Georgia outside Atlanta named after the nearby South River. The area itself is made up of disparate forested regions that are currently under proposal to be made into an official national park. The forest once held a prison farm and is a proposed site for a police training facility that has garnered protests.

History
The Muscogee Creek people inhabited the area until they were displaced in the 1820s and 1830s and referred to the region as Weelaunee Forest. Inscribed stones from a Carnegie library are among items dumped in the area.

The Old Atlanta Prison Farm was in the forest and a police training facility has been proposed for construction at the site. Protestors against the planned 85 acre police facility refer to it as Cop City. Several protestors have been arrested and one protester, Manuel Esteban Paez Terán, was killed by police in January 2023. There have been plans since 2022 to allow development of the land containing the prison farm by BlackHall Studio in order to create the largest sound stage in the United States.

In 1999, Jillian Wootten wrote a historical analysis of the honor farm facility in the forest. Plans to officially name the South River Forest a national park began in the early 2010's, with a smaller portion of it designated the South River Park in 2017 by the Atlanta City Planning Commissioner Tim Keane.

See also
Stop Cop City
Atlanta tree canopy
Treaty of Indian Springs

References

Forests of Georgia (U.S. state)